Sarpedon was a coastal town of ancient Cilicia, mentioned by the anonymous author of the Periplus of Pseudo-Scylax as abandoned in his time.

Its site is likely located near Cape Sarpedonion (Incekum Burnu) in Asiatic Turkey.

References

Populated places in ancient Cilicia
Former populated places in Turkey
Lost ancient cities and towns